The 1983 Winter Universiade, the XI Winter Universiade, took place in Sofia, Bulgaria. This was one of only four Universiades since Winter 1981 with no official mascot.

Medal table

External links

 International University Sport Federation (FISU)

1983
U
U
U
Multi-sport events in Bulgaria
Sports competitions in Sofia
1980s in Sofia
February 1983 sports events in Europe
Winter sports competitions in Bulgaria